Beddington Lake is a lake in Washington County, Maine, United States. The outflow and primary inflow to Beddington Lake is from the Narraguagus River. There are a number of unpaved roads and private residences surrounding the lake.

References

Lakes of Washington County, Maine
Glacial lakes of the United States
Lakes of Maine